This article lists all rugby league footballers who have played first-grade for the Cronulla-Sutherland Sharks in the National Rugby League.

NOTES:
 Debut:
 Players are listed in the order of their debut game with the club.
 Players that debuted in the same game are added in the order of their jersey number. 
 This excludes the inaugural lineup which is ordered alphabetically.
 Appearances: Cronulla-Sutherland Sharks games only, not a total of their career games. For example, Luke Lewis has played a career total of 324 first-grade games but of those, 116 were at Cronulla.
 Previous Club: refers to the previous first-grade rugby league club (NRL or Super League) the player played at and does not refer to any junior club, Rugby Union club or a rugby league club he was signed to but never played at.
 The statistics in this table are correct as of round 2 of the 2023 NRL season.

List of players

References

External links
 
 
 
 
 

Lists of Australian rugby league players
National Rugby League lists
Sydney-sport-related lists